Distocambarus youngineri, the Newberry burrowing crayfish, is a species of crayfish in the family Cambaridae. It is endemic to South Carolina. The common name refers to Newberry county, where the original specimens were found.

The IUCN conservation status of Distocambarus youngineri is "VU", vulnerable. The species faces a high risk of endangerment in the medium term. The population is decreasing. The IUCN status was reviewed in 2010.

References

Further reading

 
 

Cambaridae
Articles created by Qbugbot
Freshwater crustaceans of North America
Crustaceans described in 1985
Taxa named by Horton H. Hobbs Jr.
Endemic fauna of South Carolina